Aina was a German progressive metal project produced by Sascha Paeth with a number of guest appearances including Glenn Hughes, Michael Kiske and Candice Night. It resulted in the metal opera Days of Rising Doom, which was released in 2003 by Transmission/The End Records. The concept was created by Amanda Somerville who also wrote the lyrics. The music was composed by Robert Hunecke-Rizzo. Ten years after its release, Paeth indicated that there were no plans to revisit the project.

Story
The album tells the story of a fictional country, Aina, ruled by King Taetius. It begins with a warning delivered to King Taetius (Damian Wilson) from The Prophets. ("Revelations") The story involves a love triangle between Oria Allyahan (Candice Night) and the two sons of King Taetius: Talon (Glenn Hughes) and Torek (Thomas Rettke). ("Silver Maiden") After the death of Taetius, Torek becomes the king of Aina. However, he flees the kingdom in rage and humiliation when Talon is the one that gains lady Oria's hand in marriage. ("Flight of Torek")

Torek befriends a gruesome race known as the Krakhon, to whom he becomes a mix of king and deity; he also takes on the name of their deity, Sorvahr. ("Naschtok Is Born") Quickly, Sorvahr gathers the army of the Krakhon and leads them into a war against the whole world. ("The Beast Within") Eventually he sieges and takes over Aina, casting out his brother, Talon, as well as Talon's wife, Oria, and daughter, Oriana. ("The Siege of Aina") In an effort to preserve his kingdom, Talon sends Oriana away from him where she can be safe. ("Talon's Last Hope") Meanwhile, Sorvahr rapes Oria, who eventually gives birth to Syrius. ("Rape of Oria", "Son of Sorvahr")

Unknowing of their relation to each other (as half-siblings and as enemies), Oriana and Syrius meet one another and fall in love. ("Serendipity") As the couple reaches adulthood, Talon returns to the kingdom with a new army to retake the throne of Aina. ("Rebellion") Talon takes Oriana with him to help lead the army; on the other side, Sorvahr takes Syrius with him to lead the opposing army. As Oriana and Syrius meet in battle, they declare a tentative peace on the battlefield. The peace is shattered when Sorvahr, disgusted with his son for making peace rather than war, kills Syrius. Horrified and enraged, Oriana then takes the fight back to Sorvahr and defeats him on the battlefield. ("Oriana's Wrath") She then takes the throne of the newly reinstated Kingdom of Aina. ("Restoration")

Track listing

Disc 1: Days of Rising Doom
 "Aina Overture" - 2:01
 "Revelations" - 5:29                 
 "Silver Maiden" - 5:00
 "Flight of Torek" - 5:21
 "Naschtok is Born" - 4:39
 "The Beast Within" - 3:17
 "The Siege of Aina" - 6:50
 "Talon's Last Hope" - 6:10
 "Rape of Oria" - 3:05
 "Son of Sorvahr" - 2:58
 "Serendipity" - 4:04
 "Lalae Amer" - 4:13
 "Rebellion" - 4:01
 "Oriana's Wrath" - 6:13
 "Restoration" - 4:55

Disc 2: The Story of Aina
 "The Story Of Aina" - (instrumental) - 15:08
 "The Beast Within" - (single version) - 3:43
 "Ve Toura Sol-Rape Of Oria" - (Ainae version) - 3:05
 "Flight Of Torek" - (single version) - 3:33
 "Silver Maiden" - (alternate version) - 4:59
 "Talon's Last Hope" - (demo) - 5:46
 "The Siege Of Aina" - (single version) - 3:55
 "The Story Of Aina" - 15:08
 "Oriana's Wrath" - (alternate version) (Japanese Bonus Track) - 6:11

Personnel
Credits for Days of Rising Doom adapted from liner notes.

Aina
 Amanda Somerville – vocals as Maiden Voice and Oriana's Conscience, choir vocals
 Robert Hunecke-Rizzo – drums, guitars, bass, choir vocals, mixing, engineering
 Michael Rodenberg – keyboards, effects, choir vocals, vocals as The Prophet, mixing, engineering

Additional personnel
 Glenn Hughes – Talon
 Michael Kiske – Narrator
 André Matos – Tyran
 Candice Night – Oria
 Sass Jordan – Oriana
 Tobias Sammet – Narrator
 Marko Hietala – Syrius
 Sebastian Thomson – The Storyteller
 Damian Wilson – King Taetius
 Thomas Rettke – Torek (Sorvahr)
 Olaf Hayer – Baktúk
 Cinzia Rizzo – vocals
 Rannveig Sif Sigurdardottir – vocals
 Simone Simons – soprano vocals
 Ann Shee – choir vocals
 Oliver Hartmann – The Prophets
 Herbie Langhans – The Prophets
 The Trinity School Boys Choir – The Angelic Ainae Choir

Additional musicians
 Olaf Reitmeier – acoustic guitars on "Revelations" and "Serendipity", engineering
 Derek Sherinian – keyboard solo on "The Siege of Aina"
 Jens Johansson – keyboard solo on "Revelations"
 T.M. Stevens – bass on "Son of Sorvahr"
 Axel Naschke – organ on "Son of Sorvahr"
 Emppu Vuorinen – guitar solo on "Rebellion"
 Thomas Youngblood – guitar solo on "Lalae Amêr"
 Erik Norlander – keyboard solo on "Rebellion"
 Andreas Pfaff, Gregor Dierck, Thomas Glöckner – violins
 David Schlage, Stefanie Priess – violas
 Jörn Kellermann, Lauri Angervo – cellos

Production
 Sascha Paeth – additional arrangements, mixing, engineering
 Peter van 't Riet – mastering
 Adam Briggs – artwork
 Carsten Drescher – layout
 Marc Klinnert – cover concept, artwork, logo
 Hans van Vuuren – executive producer

References

German progressive metal musical groups
German power metal musical groups
Musical groups established in 2003
Concept albums
Rock operas
2003 albums